Alice H. Putnam (1841 - January 19, 1919) was an educator who opened the first private kindergarten in Chicago in 1874, and was described as "the pioneer of the Kindergarten" in that city.

Life 
Putnam "became interested in the kindergarten when her children were young". She therefore "found ways of combining her own mothering with working to help others to become better mothers". "Realizing that she needed kindergarten training, Putnam took her oldest daughter with her to Columbus, Ohio, where she studied in a training school run by Anna J. Ogden".

In 1879, Putnam was joined in Chicago by Elizabeth Harrison, who became Putnam's assistant for a year before continuing with her own studies elsewhere. In 1880 Putnam took over a Chicago training class that had been started by Anna J. Ogden, which then became the Chicago Froebel Association, directed by Putnam until 1910. Putnam was a member of the International Kindergarten Union from its organization, in 1883, until her death, serving on its most important committees, and twice as its president.

Death 
She was interred at Oak Woods Cemetery, Chicago, on January 21, 1919.

References

1919 deaths
1841 births
American educators